The Nopah Range is a mountain range located in Inyo County, California, United States, near the eastern border with Nevada.

Geography
The mountain range lies east of the adjacent Resting Spring Range, the Owlshead Mountains and lower Death Valley, and are north of the Kingston Range. The Amargosa River is to the west. They are located directly east of Shoshone, California, and the Chicago Valley, northeast of Tecopa, California, southwest of Pahrump, Nevada, and west of Las Vegas, Nevada.

The Nopah Range reaches an elevation of 6,395 feet above sea level at Nopah Peak, in the center of the range. The Nopah Range is approximately 26 miles long.

Wilderness
The Nopah Range Wilderness consists of 106,623 acres of the mountain range.  Established in 1994 by the U.S. Congress, the wilderness area is managed by the U.S. Bureau of Land Management.  Elevations range from 1,800 feet (548 m) to 6,395 feet (1949 m).
The South Nopah Range Wilderness includes 17,059 acres of lower elevation foothills of the range.

Gallery

See also
Category: Mountain ranges of the Mojave Desert
Kingston Peak

References

External links
Nopah Range Wilderness - BLM
South Nopah Range Wilderness - BLM

Mountain ranges of Inyo County, California
Mountain ranges of the Mojave Desert